Allium calamarophilon is a species of plant in the genus Allium. It is endemic to Greece, known only from one small population on the Island of Euboea, on a rocky ledge in the center of the island near the town of Kimi.  Its natural habitats are Mediterranean-type shrubby vegetation and rocky shores. It is threatened by habitat loss.

Allium calamarophilon is a very small plant with a short, slender scape barely 12 cm tall. Leaves are lanceolate. Umbel contains 5-8 white or pink flowers with dark midstripes along each of the tepals

References

External links
 

calamarophilon
Flora of Greece
Euboea
Onions
Plants described in 1981
Data deficient plants
Taxonomy articles created by Polbot